Ẋ (minuscule: ẋ) is a letter of the Latin alphabet, formed from X with the addition of a dot.

Usage

Chechen
Ẋ is present in the Chechen Latin alphabet, created in the 1990s. The Cyrillic equivalent is Хь, which represents the voiceless epiglottal fricative .

Computing code

References

Latin letters with diacritics
Chechen language